The Baumgardener's Covered Bridge is a covered bridge that spans Pequea Creek in Lancaster County, Pennsylvania, United States.  A county-owned and maintained bridge, its official designation is the Pequea #10 Bridge.
Note: The mill was constructed in 1800.

The bridge has a single span, wooden, double Burr arch trusses design with the addition of steel hanger rods.  The deck is made from oak planks.  It is painted red, the traditional color of Lancaster County covered bridges, on both the inside and outside.  Both approaches to the bridge are painted in the traditional white color.

The bridge's WGCB Number is 38-36-25. It was listed on the National Register of Historic Places on December 11, 1980.

History 
The Baumgardener's Covered Bridge was built in 1860 by Davis Kitch at a cost of $1,284. In 1987 the bridge was restored after it was damaged in a flood the previous year.

Gallery

See also
 List of covered bridges in Lancaster County, Pennsylvania
 List of covered bridges on the National Register of Historic Places in Pennsylvania
 National Register of Historic Places listings in Lancaster County, Pennsylvania

References 

Bridges completed in 1860
Covered bridges in Lancaster County, Pennsylvania
Covered bridges on the National Register of Historic Places in Pennsylvania
National Register of Historic Places in Lancaster County, Pennsylvania
Road bridges on the National Register of Historic Places in Pennsylvania
Wooden bridges in Pennsylvania
Burr Truss bridges in the United States